Major credit rating agencies give out the sovereign credit rating of each nation as an absolute grade – see list of countries by credit rating. A particular nation's rating score is independent of the performance of other nation. But in the comparative rating index of sovereigns (CRIS) introduced by India, performance of one nation is compared with all other nations. Perhaps it was the first sovereign rating index by any country in the world. This solves the limitations of the existing credit rating system. An example of comparative rating is the percentile score—the way GATE results are at times given. If a student is described as belonging to the 99th percentile, it clearly says something about this student’s performance vis-à-vis other students.

Limitations of existing system
A nation might have travelled down the rating ladder in absolute terms. But it may be, in relative terms, better off because others have done even worse. This relative performance cannot be measured in the present system.

Advantages of CRIS 
When an investor searches across nations for a place to put her money, the relative rating of nations is important. If nation x’s rating remaining the same, other nations’ ratings improve over time, there may well be a case to invest less in nation x.

How it is calculated
The Ministry of Finance, India calculated this new index and ranks 101 economies for the years 2007 to 2011.  The computation of CRIS is based on Moody's ratings and data on the GDPs (not adjusted for purchasing power parity (PPP)) of different nations as given by the IMF. It is a pure mathematical and statistical methods without interventions or interpretations.  The full paper is, as of July 2015, classified.

CRIS scores 
The CRIS scores for India were 66.47 (2007) and 69.83 (2011).  In other words, in relative terms India has become a better investment destination by 5.06%. In addition, India’s rank in terms of CRIS has moved up from 61st to 55th. If we view the rankings in terms of quintiles (blocks of one-fifth of the distribution) India moves from the fourth quintile to the third, that is, the middle quintile. 
As expected the CRIS score for Greece has dropped sharply from 74.24 in 2007 to 13.97 in 2011—a decline of 81%; and that of Ireland and Portugal have dropped by more than 14%. In terms of CRIS, the U.S. has seen its score rise from 78.20 to 81.81. This is accompanied by a loss of rank from the top of the chart to the 16th position. This shows that CRIS is distinct from a percentile score which is also a relative measure of status. In 2007 the 1st rank was shared between 20 economies but by 2011 this cohort had shrunk to 15. 
The improvement in CRIS scores of nations such as India, China and Indonesia are partly due to the dramatic falls of scores of some European nations leading to a deterioration of the world average by over 4.8%.

All the BRICS had improvements in rank as well as index value.

The ten highest increases in the CRIS from 2007 to 2011 were achieved by (1) Paraguay (31.26%), (2) Lebanon (22.71%), (3) Bolivia (21.2%), (4) Uruguay (18.09%), (5) Belize and Nicaragua (both 15.63%), (7) Philippines (14.26%), (8) Indonesia (12.83%), (9) Peru (12.75%) and (10) Ecuador (12.27%). In interpreting these results, it needs to be borne in mind that for countries which began with low CRIS values, the scope for improvement is more. Seventeen economies had negative growth in the CRIS across this period. The ten highest decreases were (1) Greece (−81.19%), (2) Portugal (−14.82%), (3) Ireland (−14.14%), (4) Iceland (−11.52%), (5) Belarus (−10.05%), (6) Jamaica (−7.45%), (7) Egypt (−7.16%), (8) Cyprus (−5.94%), (9) Pakistan (−5.83%) and (10) Hungary (−4.66%).

References 

Rating systems